The 2003 FIA GT Estoril 500 km was the ninth round the 2003 FIA GT Championship.  It took place at the Autódromo do Estoril, Portugal, on 5 October 2003.

Official results
Class winners in bold.  Cars failing to complete 70% of winner's distance marked as Not Classified (NC).

Statistics
 Pole position – #5 Force One Racing Festina – 1:36.222
 Fastest lap – #22 BMS Scuderia Italia – 1:37.708
 Average speed – 147.120 km/h

References

 
 
 

E
FIA GT